Bieria, or Vovo (Wowo), is an Oceanic language spoken on Epi Island, in Vanuatu.

References

Epi languages
Critically endangered languages